Preures is a commune in the Pas-de-Calais department in the Hauts-de-France region of France.

Geography
This small village is located in the Haute-Artois region.  It comprises several hamlets, in a rather hilly relief. It is crossed by the Baillons, a tributary of the Canche river. It is located 15 km northeast of Montreuil-sur-Mer at the junction of the D150 and D148 roads and 25 km south-east of Boulogne-sur-Mer, 33 km southwest of Saint-Omer, 70 km north-west of Arras, and about 200 km north of Paris.  The presence of Merovingian tombs – discovered in a meadow not far from the center of the village – attests to its antiquity.

History
From 1930 to 1933, more than 75 tombs were searched: weapons, vases, and jewels abound. The most remarkable discovery was The Horse of Preures, a bronze fibula.

Jean de Preures, a knight, married the 14th century Marie de Mailly, daughter of Gilles, lord of Authuiles; their son, married to Jeanne de Brimeu, was the last of his race. The heiress of the important lordship of Preures married successively: Archambaud de Croÿ who was killed at the Battle of Agincourt in 1415; Jean de Fosseux, chamberlain of the Duke of Burgundy, and finally the lord of Commines. From that time Preures never ceased to belong to the illustrious barons of Thiembronne: its first owners were the Bournel family, then the Rouault-Gamaches; then the then de Brune de Montlauet, and finally Jacques de Bullion, marquis of Farvacques who transmitted the domain to the Gontaut-Biron, Biencourt, and Rohan-Chabot families.

The  Confraternity of Charitable was founded in 1627 in the church of Preures and restored in 1836.

The pilgrimage of Saint Adrien is popular in the region. It is invoked to obtain protection from epidemics; every seven years, the people of Samer go in procession to the church of Preures in order to implore his powerful intercession.

The canons of Boulogne (heirs of the chapter of Thérouanne), whose rights had been confirmed in 1179 by Pope Alexander III, shared a tithe with the prior of Renty and with the owner of the chapel of St. John the Baptist.

In 1554 the castle was destroyed by the Duke of Norfolk after having besieged it. In 1662, Bertrand Postel, Sieur du Clivet, took the lead of the rebels of Boulonnais in the Lustucru Revolt and dragged them to Hucqueliers where the fortress served as a base for the final denouement. In retaliation, the king's soldiers burned his patrimonial manor. Arrested, du Clivet succumbed to the breaking wheel on August 19, 1662. In 1820, the hamlet of Séhen tried to fight for its parish independence. For this purpose they had built a chapel, which was subsequently banned in 1885.

Population
The inhabitants are called Preurois or Preuroises.

Places of interest
 Vestiges of a Merovingian cemetery.
 The church of St. Martin, dating from the fifteenth century.

See also
 Communes of the Pas-de-Calais department

References

Communes of Pas-de-Calais